is a Japanese professional wrestler, who currently performs in World Wonder Ring Stardom as a freelancer, under the ring name Karma. She also works in World Woman Wrestling Diana, as well as appearing in such promotions as Pro Wrestling Wave, PURE-J and YMZ.

Professional wrestling career

World Women's Wrestling Diana (2019-present)
Umesaki debuted for Diana in 2019. She is also known for competing in multiple promotions of the Japanese independent scene. At Seadlinnng Shin-Kiba 23rd NIGHT on March 23, 2020, she picked up a voctory over Honori Hana. At New Ice Ribbon #1078, an event produced by Ice Ribbon on October 31, 2020, Umesaki unsuccessfully faced Suzu Suzuki for the ICE Cross Infinity Championship. At a house show promoted by Pure-J on June 13, 2021, she unsuccessfully challenged Akari for the Princess of Pro Wrestling Championship. At Oz Academy Complete Control on February 13, 2022, Umesaki teamed up with Kakeru Sekiguchi to defeat Mei Suruga and Momoka Hanazono. On the fourth night of the Sendai Girls Acceleration, an event promoted by Sendai Girls' Pro Wrestling on February 27, 2022, Umesaki teamed up with Saori Anou in a losing effort against Manami and Ryo Mizunami as a result of a tag team match.

Umesaki often competes in men's promotions as joshi talent. At 2AW Ayame Sasamura & Rina Shingaki Produce ~ Butterfly Dance, an event promoted by Active Advance Pro Wrestling on March 14, 2021, she fell short to Kakeru Sekiguchi.  At ZERO1 Kumamoto Ekimae Pro-Wrestling 2021 Fuyu No Jin ~ Serious Pro-Wrestling In The Midst Of Infection Control, an event promoted by Pro Wrestling Zero1 on December 4, 2021, she teamed up with Rina Amikura in a losing effort against Hanako Nakamori and Takako Inoue.

Pro Wrestling Wave (2019-present)
Another promotion in which Umesaki activates in Pro Wrestling Wave. She is known for competing in the promotion's signature events such as Catch the Wave, making her first appearance at the 2019 edition, placing herself in the "Young Block" and scoring a total of two points after going against Hiro'e, Ibuki Hoshi and Maria. At the 2021 edition, she competed in the "Compliance Block" and scored a total of two points after going against Rin Kadokura, Yuki Miyazaki and Hibiscus Mii. Umesaki also competed in the Dual Shock Wave, at the 2020 edition where she teamed up with her "Luminous" tag team partner Miyuki Takase, falling short to Itsuki Aoki and Rin Kadokura, and Rina Shingaki and Ayame Sasamura in the first-rounds of the tournament.

World Wonder Ring Stardom (2022)
Umesaki competed in several of World Wonder Ring Stardom's major events. She made her first appearance at Stardom New Blood 1 on March 11, 2022, where she teamed up with Nanami in a losing effort against Oedo Tai's Starlight Kid and Ruaka. She competed in a Cinderella Rumble match on the second night of the Stardom World Climax 2022 from March 27, match won by Mei Suruga and also involving notable opponents such as Unagi Sayaka, Mina Shirakawa, Lady C, Saki Kashima and many others.

Championships and accomplishments
Pro Wrestling Wave
Wave Tag Team Championship (1 time) – with Miyuki Takase
Pure-J
Princess of Pro Wrestling Championship (1 time)
World Woman Wrestling Diana
World Woman Pro-Wrestling Diana Tag Team Championship (3 times, current) – with Miyuki Takase

References

2001 births
Living people
Japanese female professional wrestlers
People from Ibaraki Prefecture